The Nicolaïkerk is a Romano-Gothic hall church in Appingedam in the Netherlands. The church is used by the Protestant Church in the Netherlands. The building is a rijksmonument (national heritage site) since 1968 and one of the Top 100 Dutch heritage sites that was selected in 1990.

References

External links 

  Nicolaïkerk Appingedam, official website

Churches in Groningen (province)
Hall churches
Rijksmonuments in Groningen (province)